Swamp Creek is a tributary of the Delaware River in Tinicum Township, Bucks County, Pennsylvania in the United States.

Course

Statistics
Swamp Creek was entered into the Geographic Names Information System on 30 August 1990 as identification number 1196207.

Geology
Appalachian Highlands Division
Piedmont Province
Gettysburg-Newark Lowland Section
Brunswick Formation
Atlantic Plain
Atlantic Coastal Plain Province
Lowland and Intermediate Upland Section
Trenton Gravel

Swamp Creek rises in a stretch of the Brunswick Formation which consists of mudstone, siltstone, and shale. Mineralogy includes argillite and some hornfels. As it turns from the southeast leg to the north oriented leg it passes into the Trenton Gravel of the Atlantic Plain, consisting of sand and clay-silt layers.

Crossings and Bridges

See also
List of rivers of the United States
List of rivers of Pennsylvania
List of Delaware River tributaries

References

Rivers of Bucks County, Pennsylvania
Rivers of Pennsylvania
Tributaries of the Delaware River